Laida is a gram panchayat in the district of Sambalpur in the state of Odisha in India.

References

Villages in Sambalpur district